Salvatore Castiglione (21 April 1620 – 1676) was an Italian painter of the Baroque period. He was born in Genoa, the brother and pupil of Giovanni Benedetto Castiglione, and he painted landscapes and pastoral subjects. He also completed a highly finished etching representing the '’Resurrection of Lazarus’' (1645).

Sources

• Jaco Rutgers, 'Not Giovanni Benedetto but Salvatore Castiglione', Print Quarterly, vol. XXI, no. 2, June 2004, pp. 163–164.

1620 births
1676 deaths
Artists from Genoa
17th-century Italian painters
Italian male painters
Italian engravers
Italian Baroque painters